Franklin Falls is a waterfall on the South fork of the Snoqualmie River, the first of three major waterfalls on the South Fork Snoqualmie River. The falls are located near Snoqualmie Pass in King County, Washington, United States, between the north and south lanes of Interstate 90, just east of exit 47. The first drop is a very scenic  block-shaped fall. The second drop is a  fanning cascade. The final drop begins as a 25-foot slide, which bends to the right, then plunges over the final  drop seen from the base of the falls. The falls are popular canyoneering destination. The upper two drops are north of the freeway.

References
 
 
 
 

Waterfalls of King County, Washington
Waterfalls of Washington (state)